The paraphyletic "Platyzoa"  are a group of protostome unsegmented animals proposed by Thomas Cavalier-Smith in 1998. Cavalier-Smith included in Platyzoa the phylum Platyhelminthes (or flatworms), and a new phylum, the Acanthognatha, into which he gathered several previously described phyla of microscopic animals. Later it has been described as paraphyletic, containing the Rouphozoa and the Gnathifera.

Phyla

One scheme placed the following phyla in Platyzoa:

 Rouphozoa
 Platyhelminthes
 Gastrotricha
 Gnathifera
 Syndermata
 Rotifera
 Seisonida
 Acanthocephala
 Gnathostomulida
 Micrognathozoa
 Cycliophora

Characteristics
None of the Platyzoa groups have a respiration or circulation system because of their small size, flat body or parasitic lifestyle. The Platyhelminthes and Gastrotricha are acoelomate.  The other phyla have a pseudocoel, and share characteristics such as the structure of their jaws and pharynx, although these have been secondarily lost in the parasitic Acanthocephala.  They form a monophyletic subgroup called the Gnathifera.

The name "Platyzoa" is used because most members are flat, though rotifers are not.

Classification
The Platyzoa are close relatives of the Lophotrochozoa. Together the two make up the Spiralia.

Syndermata was a proposed clade that included Acanthocephala and rotifers, but as it appears they are not sister groups after all, the clade has been abandoned.

A recent possible cladogram is shown which would show that the Lophotrochozoa emerged within Platyzoa as a sister group of the Rouphozoa (the Gastrotricha and Platyhelminthes). The Lophotrochozoa and  Rouphozoa are then named the Platytrochozoa. This makes the Platyzoa a paraphyletic group.

References

The Taxonomicon - Taxon: Infrakingdom Platyzoa Cavalier-Smith, 1998 - retrieved January 31, 2006
Triploblastic Relationships with Emphasis on the Acoelomates and the Position of Gnathostomulida, Cycliophora, Plathelminthes, and Chaetognatha: A Combined Approach of 18S rDNA Sequences and Morphology - retrieved January 31, 2006
Myzostomida Are Not Annelids: Molecular and Morphological Support for a Clade of Animals with Anterior Sperm Flagella - retrieved January 31, 2006
Current advances in the phylogenetic reconstruction of metazoan evolution. A new paradigm for the Cambrian explosion? - retrieved January 31, 2006

 
Superphyla